Hammerhead: Shark Frenzy, also known as Sharkman or simply Hammerhead, is a 2005 Syfy original movie, written by Kenneth M. Badish and Boaz Davidson, and directed by Michael Oblowitz. The film stars William Forsythe, Hunter Tylo, and Jeffrey Combs. The film premiered on Syfy on June 18, 2005.

Plot
Paul King (Anton Argirov) dies of kidney cancer.  Five years later, his father Preston King (Jeffrey Combs), a scientist, invites the doctors that could not save his son to his uncharted island in the western Pacific. Paul's widowed wife Amelia Lockhart (Hunter Tylo), who believes Paul died five years ago from cancer, and Amelia's new love interest Tom Reed (William Forsythe), also travel to the island. There, King reveals that Paul never died and was saved from death by being injected with hammerhead shark DNA to modify his stem cells.  This turned Paul into a half-man/half-shark creature. King releases the water from the tank where he was keeping Paul, in hopes that he will eat the doctors as revenge for them firing him from his job five years previously. As Paul, now known as Hammerhead, chases after them, they escape along with Hammerhead.

Hammerhead starts to attack Bernie nearly the docks and almost rip his right leg off. He then kills Julie by ripping her apart into pieces when she is separated from Whitney. Then the monster kills the wounded Bernie, then the doctor Katie Medevenko who sided with the protagonists but unfortunately falls into water after King's men attack where Hammerhead kills her, and he eats Jane alive while she tries to relieve her burns.

Hammerhead begins killing the workers on the island and tracking down King's "guests" until he is eventually recaptured by King's remaining workers. King's men also capture Amelia, who King hopes his son will remember and mate with to create a half-human/half-shark offspring, as he is convinced that part of Paul is still human. King forces Amelia to watch as one of the doctors, Whitney Feder (Arthur Roberts), is fed to Hammerhead. Amelia is then injected with a drug to calm her as King watches in hopes that Hammerhead will mate with her. However, instead of mating with Amelia, Hammerhead bites off his father's right arm. Tom arrives at the laboratory and rescues Amelia. He forces liquid nitrogen down Hammerhead's throat, causing him to explode. King attempts to shoot Amelia, but Tom shoots him dead. The building explodes as Amelia and Tom, the only two survivors, escape.

Cast
 Hunter Tylo as Amelia Lockhart
 William Forsythe as Tom Reed
 Jeffrey Combs as Dr. Preston King
 Anton Argirov as Paul King / Hammerhead
 Elise Muller as Jane Harper
 Mariya Ignatova as Julie
 Lydie Denier as Dr. Katie Medevenko
 Arthur Roberts as Whitney Feder
 G.R. Johnson as Bernie Amos
 Velizar Binev as Dr. Krause
 Atanas Srebrev as Erik Anderson
 Raicho Vasilev as Guard #2

Release

Home media
Hammerhead: Shark Frenzy was first released on DVD on October 11, 2005 by First Look Pictures. First Look Pictures later re-released the film on DVD in 2009 as a part of a 2-disk double feature along with Blue Demon.

Reception

Jon Condit from Dread Central awarded the film a negative score of 2/5. In his review, Condit wrote, "Hammerhead: Shark Frenzy has most of the usual problems movies of this type have – clichéd plot, subplots, supporting characters, and minor details that are introduced but never really followed through on, dull protagonists, illogical science, a monster that somehow manages to always be at just the right place at the right time, inconsistent special effects, etc. All of this would be easier to overlook if the movie gave us the killer landshark action we’re watching the movie for. We do get it but only in quick bursts that fail to fully satisfy." Popcorn Pictures.com awarded the film a score of 4/10, writing, "Hammerhead: Shark Frenzy is a mixed bag. You have a preposterously-plotted but perfectly watchable B-movie which, sadly, is let down by a number of clichés and a sense of being too self-conscious to embrace its ridiculousness and go all-out. Not enough of the titular character hurts matters greatly too." Horror.net awarded the film a mixed 5 out of 10 stars, calling it "A good, goofy B-monster movie." Christopher Armstead from Film Critics United gave the film a negative review, criticizing the film's acting, and the title monster's lack of screen time.

See also 
 Snakeman (film)
 List of killer shark films
 List of Sci Fi Pictures original films

References

External links
 
 
 

2005 films
2005 horror films
2005 television films
American monster movies
Fictional sharks
Films about sharks
Films about shark attacks
Films set on islands
Mad scientist films
2000s monster movies
American natural horror films
Nu Image films
Syfy original films
Films set in Oceania
Films directed by Michael Oblowitz
2000s English-language films
Films produced by Boaz Davidson
Films with screenplays by Boaz Davidson
2000s American films